Ezinihitte Mbaise is a local Government Area in Imo State, Nigeria. Its headquarter is in Itu.

External links
 Amumara Autonomous Community 

Local Government Areas in Imo State
Towns in Imo State
Local Government Areas in Igboland